Abdullah Abdulqadirakhun is a Uyghur refugee, who was held for more than seven years in Guantanamo Bay detention camps, in Cuba.

The Department of Defense reports that Abdulqadirakhum was born on June 18, 1979, in Xinjiang, China and assigned him the Internment Serial Number 285.

Abdulqadirakhun was one of the 22 Uighurs held in Guantanamo. It was later learned that he was innocent of the claims against him.

He won his habeas corpus in 2008. Judge Ricardo Urbina declared his detention as unlawful and ordered to set him free in the United States. He was sent to Bermuda in June 2009 together with three other Uyghurs, Khalil Mamut, Huzaifa Parhat and Emam Abdulahat, on June 11, 2009.

References

External links

 From Guantánamo to the United States: The Story of the Wrongly Imprisoned Uighurs Andy Worthington October 9, 2008
 Judge Ricardo Urbina’s unclassified opinion (redacted version)
 MOTIONS/STATUS HEARING - UIGHURS CASES BEFORE THE HONORABLE RICARDO M. URBINA
 Human Rights First; Habeas Works: Federal Courts’ Proven Capacity to Handle Guantánamo Cases (2010)

Chinese Islamists
Chinese extrajudicial prisoners of the United States
1979 births
Living people
Uyghurs
Guantanamo detainees known to have been released
People from Xinjiang